Pétange railway station is a railway station serving Pétange, in south-western Luxembourg.  It is operated by Chemins de Fer Luxembourgeois, the state-owned railway company.

The station is the main terminus of Line 60, which connects Luxembourg City to the Red Lands of the south of the country. It is also located on Line 70, which connects Luxembourg City to the south-west, continuing to Athus in Belgium and Longwy in France.

The station was created as the main hub of the Prince Henri Railway.
Adjacent to the CFL station is a platform served by Train 1900. From here the line runs up the hill to Fond-de-Gras. It originally served the region's iron mines.

From 1973 until 1969, Pétange was the terminus of the Attert Line (Ligne d'Attert) which provided a direct connection to Ettelbruck.

External links
 Official CFL page on Pétange station
 Rail.lu page on Pétange station

Railway stations in Pétange
Railway stations on CFL Line 60
Railway stations on CFL Line 70